Neocollyris schillhammeri is a species of ground beetle in the genus Neocollyris in the family Carabidae. It was described by Naviaux in 2008.

References

Schillhammeri, Neocollyris
Beetles described in 2008